Christopher Lee Crawford (born May 13, 1975) is an American former professional basketball player who was selected by the Atlanta Hawks in the second round (50th pick overall) of the 1997 NBA Draft. A 6'9" forward from Marquette University, Crawford played in 7 NBA seasons, all with the Hawks. His best year was in the 2003–04 season where he averaged a career high 10.2 points per game. After his stint with Atlanta, in which he missed the entire 2004–05 season because of a torn ligament in his right knee, Crawford was released, and had a tryout with the New Jersey Nets, but did not ever play for them.

In his NBA career, Crawford played in 252 games and scored a total of 1,654 points.

Notes

External links
 NBA.com Profile

1975 births
Living people
Atlanta Hawks draft picks
Atlanta Hawks players
Basketball players from Michigan
Marquette Golden Eagles men's basketball players
Power forwards (basketball)
Sportspeople from Kalamazoo, Michigan
American men's basketball players